The Hunslet DH60C is a shunter developed by Hunslet Engine Company. It has a robust modern design and is intended for heavy shunting and short industrial trips.

Background and design
In 2007 the Hunslet Engine Company announced that it was developing a new shunter type, with a family of diesel hydraulic designs (B, C or B'B' axle arrangement) up to 100 tonnes posited for future development, in 2008 manufacture of the first model - a 60tonne, 3 axle machine began. The first locomotive of type DH60C was unveiled at Chasewater Railway in July 2010.

The locomotive applied modern design principles to a shunter designed for the UK market; the locomotive has swing arm/coil spring suspension, with vertical hydraulic damping, and pneumatic brakes. The transmission is via a hydrodynamic converter and cardan drive shafts to right angled gearbox drives on each axle.

Test trials of the locomotive were carried out at Daventry International Railfreight Terminal.

A four-wheeled variant is also being developed, and Hunslet intends to certify it for use across the UK's national rail network.

Notes

References

DH60C
Industrial diesel locomotives of Great Britain
Standard gauge locomotives of Great Britain
Railway locomotives introduced in 2010